Edie Martin (1 January 1880 – 22 February 1964) was a British actress. She was a ubiquitous performer, on stage from 1886, playing generally small parts but in high demand, appearing in scores of British films (although often uncredited). She frequently appeared in memorable Ealing comedies as their resident ”little old lady.”

Selected filmography

 M'Blimey (1931)
 Late Extra (1935) - Apartment Resident (uncredited)
 Broken Blossoms (1936) - Woman in West End Party Visit (uncredited)
 Educated Evans (1936) - Bit Part (uncredited)
 The Big Noise (1936) - Old Lady
 Feather Your Nest (1937) - Blanche (uncredited)
 Return of a Stranger (1937) - Mrs. Stevens (uncredited)
 Farewell Again (1937) - Mrs. Bulger
 Under the Red Robe (1937) - Maria
 St. Martin's Lane (1938) - Libby's Dresser (uncredited)
 Bad Boy (1938) - Mrs. Bryan
 A Spot of Bother (1938) - An Occasional Bar-Lady (uncredited)
 Old Mother Riley in Business (1941)
 Unpublished Story (1942) - Mrs. Duncan (uncredited)
 The Demi-Paradise (1943) - Miss Winifred Tisdall
 It's in the Bag (1944) - Mrs. Hicks (uncredited)
 Don't Take It to Heart (1945) - Miss Bucket
 A Place of One's Own (1945) - Cook
 They Were Sisters (1945) - Cook
 Here Comes the Sun (1946) - Mrs. Galloway
 Carnival (1946) - Martha (uncredited)
 Great Expectations (1946) - Mrs. Whimple
 The Courtneys of Curzon Street (1947) - Waitress (uncredited)
 When the Bough Breaks (1947) - Customer
 It Always Rains on Sunday (1947) - Mrs. Watson
 Oliver Twist (1948) - Annie
 My Brother's Keeper (1948) - Churchgoer Shaking Hands (uncredited)
 Another Shore (1948) - Half Crown Lady in Park (uncredited)
 Elizabeth of Ladymead (1948) - (uncredited)
 The History of Mr. Polly (1949) - Lady on roof
 Cardboard Cavalier (1949) - Argumentative Old Woman (uncredited)
 Adam and Evelyne (1949) - Woman Scrubbing Floor (uncredited)
 Blackmailed (1951) - Mrs. Porritt - a Patient
 The Galloping Major (1951) - Evelyn - Lady at Meeting (uncredited)
 The Lavender Hill Mob (1951) - Miss Evesham
 The Man in the White Suit (1951) - Mrs. Watson
 The Lady with a Lamp (1951)
 Night Was Our Friend (1951) - Old Lady Jury Member
 Time Gentlemen, Please! (1952) - Mary Wade
 The Titfield Thunderbolt (1953) - Emily
 Genevieve (1953) - Guest (uncredited)
 Meet Mr. Lucifer (1953) -  Deaf Lady (uncredited)
 The End of the Road (1954) - Gloomy Gertie
 Hobson's Choice (1954) - Old Lady Buying Shoelaces (uncredited)
 Scotland Yard (film series) (1954, July) - ('The Mysterious Bullet' episode) - (mother/grandmother) - (uncredited)
 Lease of Life (1954) - Miss Calthorp's Friend
 The Black Rider (1954) - Elderly Lady
 As Long as They're Happy (1955) - Elderly fan
 Room in the House (1955)
 The Ladykillers (1955) - Lettice (uncredited)
 An Alligator Named Daisy (1955) - Wheelchair Pusher (uncredited)
 Ramsbottom Rides Again (1956) - (uncredited)
 My Teenage Daughter (1956) - Miss Ellis
 Sailor Beware! (1956) - Little Woman in Church
 The Naked Truth (1957) - Lady in Autograph Crowd (uncredited)
 Too Many Crooks (1959) - Gordon's Mother
 Follow a Star (1959) - Old Lady (uncredited)
 Kidnapped (1960) - Woman on the bridge
 A Weekend with Lulu (1961) - Lodgekeeper's Wife (uncredited)
 Sparrows Can't Sing (1963) - Old Lady on Bench (uncredited) (final film role)

References

External links

1880 births
1964 deaths
Actresses from London
English film actresses
20th-century English actresses